The 9th General Junta was the meeting of the General Junta, the parliament of the Principality of Asturias, with the membership determined by the results of the regional snap election held on 25 March 2012. The congress met for the first time on 27 April 2012.

Election
The 9th Asturian regional election was held on 25 March 2012, as a snap election. At the election, the Spanish Socialist Workers' Party (PSOE) passed Asturias Forum (FAC) as the most voted party. Finally, a draw between left and right was broken by the only member of Union, Progress and Democracy (UPyD) that gave back the government to the left.

History
The new parliament met for the first time on 27 April 2012. After two rounds, Pedro Sanjurjo (PSOE) was elected as the president of the General Junta, in a parliament composed provisionally by 44 members out of the 45 possibles, as Foro Asturias (FAC) challenged the result of the western district to the justice court of Asturias.

Deaths, resignations and suspensions 
The 9th General Junta has seen the following deaths, resignations and suspensions:

 6 December 2012 - Carmen Sela (Foro) resigned for personal reasons. However, the media speculated that political disagreements within her party could have taken an important role in her decesion. María del Mar García Poo (Foro) replaced her on 21 December 2012.
 30 May 2012 - Isidro Martínez Oblanca (Foro) and Jesús Iglesias (IU/IX) resigned after being appointed senators by the General Junta. Carmen Fernández (Foro) and Marta Pulgar (IU/IX) replaced them on 12 July and 16 July 2012, respectively.
 9 May 2013 - Francisco González (PSOE) resigned after the opening of oral proceedings for alleged irregularities committed during his time as mayor of Cudillero. In July 2014 he left the Asturian Socialist Federation after he was found guilty of those irregularities. Elsa Peréz (PSOE) replaced him on 16 May 2013.
 29 May 2014 - Ángel González (IU/IX) was expelled by the General Junta after his refusal to resign following a ruling that disqualified him from holding public office. His expulsion was supported by PSOE, IU/IX and UPyD, while PP and Foro abstained. Earlier that month United Left of Asturias had expelled him from the party. Luis Álvarez replaced him on 16 June 2014.

Members

References

External links
Official website of the General Junta
All members of the General Junta

General Junta of the Principality of Asturias
2012 establishments in Spain